Ella Bella Bingo is a 2020 Norwegian 3D computer-animated adventure comedy film based on the preschool TV series of the same name. A joint-production between Studio 100 Films and Kool Produktion AS, the film is directed by Frank Mosvold and Atle Solberg Blakseth. It was released in Norway on 24 January 2020, and was a commercial success.

Synopsis 
Ella Bella and Henry are best friends, and plan on making a circus together, but when cool kid Johnny arrives in town he becomes Henry's new best friend, making Ella jealous and jeopardising the circus.

Voice cast 

Summer Fontana as Ella Bella 
Jack Fisher as Henry
Ben Plassala as Johnny
Richard Kind as Mr. Jackson 
Tress MacNeille as Ms. Berg
Cherokee Rose Castro as Lisa and Lottie
Fred Tatasciore as Jurgen
Katie Leigh as ticket girl
Chris Sullivan as ice cream salesman
Christopher Salazar as Ella's father
Devin Hennessy as Henry's father
Mara Junot as Henry's mother
Lane Compton as Johnny's uncle
Chris Anthony as Johnny's mother
Stephen Weese as Johnny's father
Brennan Murray as hit the can man
Henrik Lunden Tybakken as rabbit

Release 
The film was released in Norway on 24 January 2020, with an opening of $177,849. It grossed $626,491 in Norway, and $355,323 in other countries, for a worldwide total of $981,814 against a budget of NOK 1,350,000 ($164,213), making it a commercial success.

The film was released on VOD and DVD in the United States on 24 March 2020.

Critical reception 
The film received generally mixed to positive reviews from critics.

References

Further reading 
Bakkane, Chris (15 April 2021) Analysen: Elleville Elfrid (2020). [Analysis: Ella Bella Bingo] on Montages.no (in Norwegian)

External links 

Interview with English Cast of Ella Bella Bingo on YouTube

Norwegian animated films
2020 films
Norwegian children's films
2010s children's films
Animated films based on animated series